Walkin' Wheels is an American brand of dog wheelchairs or carts developed by Mark C. Robinson from Walkin' Pets by HandicappedPets.com based in Amherst, New Hampshire. The invention was created in 2001 by Mark C. Robinson in memory of Mercedes, a slightly epileptic Keeshond pet.

Overview and construction 

The first adjustable dog wheelchair in the market, Walkin' Wheels is designed to help pets with mobility problems like degenerative myelopathy, arthritis, paralysis, neurological disorders and more.

The construction consists of neoprene or fabric harness, which is clipped to an aluminum frame. The frame is attached to wheels that replace the function of the rear legs, allowing the dog increased mobility. The wheels are interchangeable, so the dog wheelchair can be used on dogs of different sizes or dogs that are in the process of growing.  A knuckle mechanism both allows the angle of the wheel to be changed based on the health of the animal, and allows the dog wheelchair to fold flat for easy transportation. The rear Walkin' Wheels wheelchair can be converted into a full support, 4-wheel wheelchair with the Front Wheel Attachment.

Awards 
 2009, Award for Best Innovation in the category of animal health and integration of pets in society at the Mascota Pet Festival & Expo in Spain.
 2009, The silver Retailer Select Award from Pet Age magazine.

References

External links
Official Website

American inventions
Dog equipment